Sint-Michielsgestel is a municipality in the southern part of the Netherlands. It is named for the village of Sint-Michielsgestel located within its boundaries.

Population centres 
 Berlicum
 Den Dungen
 
 Sint-Michielsgestel
Smaller townships, also part of Sint-Michielsgestel, are:
Besselaar, Doornhoek, Haanwijk, Hal, Halder, De Bus, De Hogert, De Loofaart, Heikantse Hoeve, Hersend, Hezelaar, Hoek, Kerkeind, Laar, Maaskantje, Nijvelaar, Plein, Ruimel, Tielse Hoeve, Wielsche Hoeven,  and Woud.

Contemporary Sint-Michielsgestel 

The municipality consists of a number of villages and rural areas just south and south east of 's-Hertogenbosch. Most inhabitants are commuters preferring to live in these quite villages, while working elsewhere. There is little industrial activity in the villages, but the agricultural sector is certainly important.

Sint-Michielsgestel and Gemonde are in the drainage basin of the river Dommel. Den Dungen, Berlicum and Middelrode are in that of the Aa (Meuse) and the Zuid-Willemsvaart. It makes that there are very few roads connecting these two groups of settlements.

History 

The current municipality Sint-Michielsgestel was created in 1996. That year the municipalities of Sint-Michielsgestel, Den Dungen (est. 1810) and Berlicum (est. 1238) were merged. The entire village of Gemonde, which had previously been part of Boxtel, Sint-Michielsgestel, Sint-Oedenrode and Schijndel, was added to the new municipality.

Local government 
The municipal council of Sint-Michielsgestel consists of 21 seats, which are divided as follows after the municipal elections of March 16 2012:

 Local Political Alliance (Plaatselijke Politieke Alliantie) - 7 seats
 CDA - 4 seats
 Dorpsgoed - 3 seats
 GroenLinks/PvdA - 2 seats
 De Gestelse Coalitie - 2 seats
 VVD - 2 seats
 D66 - 1 seat 

At the moment, the municipal board (college van burgemeester en wethouders) is formed by the Local Political Alliance, CDA and GroenLinks/PvdA.

Notable people

 Gerrit Braks (1933–2017) a Dutch politician and agronomist
 Cas Wouters (born 1943) a Dutch sociologist who embraces figurational sociology
 Anneke van Giersbergen (born 1973) a Dutch singer, songwriter, guitarist and pianist;  formerly of The Gathering

Sport 
 Jan van Grinsven (born 1960 in Den Dungen) a former football goalkeeper with 484 club caps
 Ronald Jansen (born 1963) a former field hockey goalkeeper, gold medallist in the 1996 and 2000 Summer Olympics
 Kees Akerboom Jr. (born 1983) a retired Dutch basketball player
 Tom van Weert (born 1990) a footballer with 230 club caps, currently playing at Volos, Greece

Gallery

References

External links 

 

 
Municipalities of North Brabant
Populated places in North Brabant